Sosva may refer to:
Sosva (river), a tributary of the Tavda in Sverdlovsk Oblast, Russia
 Sosva, Serovsky District, Sverdlovsk Oblast, an urban-type settlement in Serovsky District, Sverdlovsk Oblast, Russia
Sosva, Khanty–Mansi Autonomous Okrug, a settlement in Khanty–Mansi Autonomous Okrug, Russia
Sosva, Severouralsk, Sverdlovsk Oblast, a settlement under jurisdiction of the town of Severouralsk, Sverdlovsk Oblast, Russia
Sosva dialect, the base dialect of the Mansi literary language

See also 
 Severnaya Sosva River, in Khanty–Mansi Autonomous Okrug, Russia